Germaine Brée (1907–2001) was a French-American literary scholar, who wrote extensively on Marcel Proust, Andre Gide, Albert Camus, and Jean-Paul Sartre.

Life
Born in Paris, Germaine Brée grew up in the English-speaking Channel Islands. After graduating from the University of Paris, she taught in Algeria from 1932 to 1936. Appointed to teach at Bryn Mawr in 1936, she returned to France to fight for the Free French when World War II broke out. She joined a volunteer ambulance unit, rising to the rank of lieutenant, and was assigned to the intelligence section of the Free French in Algiers. She received a Bronze Star and was named to the Legion of Honor. At this time Brée befriended Albert Camus.

In 1953 Brée was appointed chair of the French department at New York University College of Arts & Science, the second woman to be appointed a department chair at the university. From 1960 until 1973 she was Professor of French at the University of Wisconsin. From 1973 until 1984 she was Kenan professor of humanities at Wake Forest University. In 1975 she served as president of the Modern Language Association. She was an elected member of both the American Philosophical Society and the American Academy of Arts and Sciences.

Works
 Marcel Proust and Deliverance From Time, 1955
 Camus, 1959
 Gide, 1963
 Camus and Sartre: Crisis and Commitment, 1972
 Women Writers in France, 1973

References

1907 births
2001 deaths
Scholars of French literature
People from the Channel Islands
French emigrants to the United States
New York University faculty
University of Wisconsin–Madison faculty
French people in French Algeria
French expatriates in the United Kingdom
Members of the American Philosophical Society
Presidents of the Modern Language Association